Martin Ingemar Gunnarsson (March 30, 1927 – September 23, 1982) was an American sport shooter who competed in the 1964 Summer Olympics.

He was born in Töreboda, Västra Götaland County, Sweden and died in Chattahoochee County, Georgia. In 1964 he won the bronze medal in the 300 meter rifle three positions competition.

References

1927 births
1982 deaths
People from Töreboda Municipality
American male sport shooters
ISSF rifle shooters
Shooters at the 1964 Summer Olympics
Olympic bronze medalists for the United States in shooting
Swedish emigrants to the United States
Medalists at the 1964 Summer Olympics
Pan American Games medalists in shooting
Pan American Games gold medalists for the United States
Shooters at the 1959 Pan American Games
Shooters at the 1963 Pan American Games
20th-century American people